Two-time defending champion Dylan Alcott defeated Andrew Lapthorne in the final, 6–2, 6–2 to win the quad singles wheelchair tennis title at the 2017 Australian Open.

Draw

Final

Round robin
Standings are determined by: 1. number of wins; 2. number of matches; 3. in two-players-ties, head-to-head records; 4. in three-players-ties, percentage of sets won, or of games won; 5. steering-committee decision.

References
 Draw 

Wheelchair Quad Singles
2017 Quad Singles